Yeah Yeah Noh are an "unpop" group formed in Leicester, England in 1983. Originally a product of the DIY post-punk era, their sound was labelled 'Calor-gas psychedelia' by Mojo magazine in 2012. They released two albums and five singles while still together in the 1980s, and have had two compilation albums issued since they initially split up in 1986.

The group reformed in 2011, an announcement appearing on the Cherry Red Records website: "STOP PRESS: Yeah Yeah Noh are back together and are playing live as of summer 2012, on the lookout for 'interesting gigs in fields; gardens with expansive lawns considered'."

Biography
Yeah Yeah Noh was formed by Derek Hammond (vocals, guitar) and John Grayland (guitar); Adrian Crossan (bass) joined them for the first single along with Graham Summers (drums). Sue Dorey (drums, vocals) was then recruited to complete the line up, debuting on the second single. Two of the band members, John Grayland and Sue Dorey (along with Damian S),  published Printhead, a free magazine focusing on independent music in Leicester and its environs. The magazine released Let's Cut a Rug, a compilation LP of songs from local independent bands.

Signing to In-Tape records, the band debuted in June 1984 with the Cottage Industry EP, featuring humorous and satirical lyrics and post-punk/jangle-pop music.  After a further two ep's, the releases so far were collected on the album When I Am A Big Girl.  

After adding Tom Slater on guitar, the band moved towards a more psychedelic sound and introduced more serious songwriting for first album proper, Cutting The Heavenly Lawn Of Greatness...Last Rites For The God Of Love in 1985, described by Sounds as "a strange and somehow deeply moving LP" .  The band released a further single but split up in 1986.  Hammond announced that he was forming two new groups, The New New Seekers and The Time Beings, but neither materialized, and he continued to work as a music journalist under the pseudonym D.J. Fontana. 

The band's Peel sessions were collected on the Fun On The Lawn Lawn Lawn album in 1986, and a retrospective Leicester Square was issued by Cherry Red Records in 2006, including several tracks recorded after the band had supposedly split.

Hammond later wrote the mythological travelogue London, England (Mainstream Publishing 1998) and Got Not Got: The A-Z of Lost Football Culture, Treasures & Pleasures (Pitch Publishing  2011), also compiling the BBC Radio 1 John Peel Show retrospective Perfect Unpop: Peel Show Hits and Long-Lost Lo-Fi Favourites (Vol. 1, 1976–80) (Cherry Red Records 2008).

The group reformed in 2012 including John, Derek and Tom from the 1980s line-up, Dermot O'Sullivan (bass) who played guitar on various later 1980s sessions, Antony Cook (drums) and Eva Landsberg (keyboards).  In October 2013, Eva Landsberg quit due to pressure of work, and Fi Hodgson replaced her.

In January 2014, the group recorded five tracks for the album due for release later that year. Automatically Saturday was remixed by the DJ Arc Vel: and the digital single, "She Pulls the Petal From the Flower", was released on 2 June 2014 on Cherry Red Records, remixed in one dub version by Score and, in another, by the Birmingham, UK, instrument inventors, The Juneau Brothers.  The band re-recorded "Another Side to Mrs. Quill", listed by Mojo magazine as one of the top fifty greatest English pop songs: the Art Collective 'Swoomptheeng' produced a re-mix of the track.  The other two tunes were, "On the Queen's Highway" and "Up on the Downs".

Discography
(chart placings shown are from the UK Independent Chart)

Singles
"Cottage Industry" (1984, In-Tape, IT008) No. 23
"Beware The Weakling Lines" (1984, In-Tape, IT010) No. 8
"Prick Up Your Ears" (1985, In-Tape, IT012) #6 came with The Yeah Yeah Noh Bumper Annual book
"(Another Side To) Mrs. Quill" (1985, In-Tape, IT020) No. 10
"Temple of Convenience" (1985, In-Tape, IT023/ITT023) No. 12The Peel Sessions EP (1987, Strange Fruit, SFPS026)

AlbumsWhen I Am A Big Girl (1985, In-Tape, IT016) (mini-LP, compilation of first three ep's) No. 22Cutting The Heavenly Lawn of Greatness...Last Rites For The God Of Love (1985, In-Tape, IT021) No. 4Fun On The Lawn, Lawn, Lawn (1986, Vuggum, BAAD2) (compilation of John Peel sessions) No. 13Leicester Square: The Best of Yeah Yeah Noh (2001, Cherry Red, CDMRED183)Automatically Saturday'' (2015, Vuggum, BAAD 003)

Current members
Derek Hammond - vocals
John Grayland - lead guitar
Tom Slater - rhythm guitar
Fi Hodgson - keyboards
Antony Cook - drums
Dermot O'Sullivan - bass guitar
Sian Howarth - backing vocals

Former members
Eva Landsberg - keyboards
Adrian Crossan - bass guitar
Sue Dorey - drums
Graham Summers - drums
Alan Jenkins - bass guitar

References

Musical groups from Leicester